Carry On Maratha is a 2015 Romance-Drama Marathi language film directed by Sanjay Londhe. It was released theatrically on 24 July 2015. This film was directorial debut of Sanjay Londhe. It stars Gashmeer Mahajani and Kashmira Kulkarni in lead. It is the debut film of Gashmeer Mahajani, son of veteran Marathi actor Ravindra Mahajani. Box office collection of this movie is around 15 crore. 

Upon Its theatrical release it received mixed reviews from critics, praised for acting but criticism for weak and predictable story, screenplay.

Synopsis
Kolhapur's young Maratha, Martand comes across Kusum, a Kannada girl looking for a lift in the middle of the road. A chance encounter turns into a love story that brings both families face-to-face. Whether the Maratha warrior will be successful in love forms the crux of the story.

Cast
 Gashmeer Mahajani as Maartand
 Kashmira Kulkarni as Kusum
 Arun Nalawade
 Amin Hajee
 Kareem Hajee
 Usha Naik
 Shantanu Moghe
 Devika Daftardar
 Kishori Ballal

Production 
'Malhari Martand' song was filmed at Khandoba Mandir of Jejuri.

Reception 
In Times of India review Mihir Bhange mentioned this film have romance, drama, action and dash comedy. It have all the elements that goes in to making crowd pleaser and gave it 3/5 star. In Maharashtra Times review by Soumitra Pote, he gave it 2/5 star, praised for Gashmeer Mahajan tough appearance but criticised for predictable, weak screenplay, story and not giving more attention to Marathi- Kanadi conflict. Diwya Marathi gave it 2.5/5 stars. In Prahar news web review it was praised for female lead's acting but criticised for screenplay.

Soundtrack

The lyrics for the film were penned by Guru Thakur, Mangesh Kangane, Ashwini Shende and Hridyashiva, with music composed by Shail – Pritesh. Yuvarani (Soi Soi) song is composed by D. Imman.

Track listing

References

External links
 
 

2015 films
2010s Marathi-language films